Lily Rani Biswas (born 5 December 1989)  is a Bangladeshi former cricketer who played as a right-arm medium bowler. She appeared in four Twenty20 Internationals for Bangladesh in 2012 and 2013. She played domestic cricket for Dhaka Division and Barisal Division.

In June 2018, she was part of Bangladesh's squad that won their first ever Women's Asia Cup title, although she did not play a match. Later that same month, she was named in Bangladesh's squad for the 2018 ICC Women's World Twenty20 Qualifier tournament.

References

External links
 
 

1989 births
Living people
People from Gopalganj District, Bangladesh
Bangladeshi Hindus
Bangladeshi women cricketers
Bangladesh women Twenty20 International cricketers
Dhaka Division women cricketers
Barisal Division women cricketers